Built on Squares is a studio album by the indie pop band Starlight Mints.

Track listing
All songs written by Allan Vest, Andy Nunez & Marian Nunez.
"Black Cat"
"Brass Digger"
"Goldstar"
"Pages"
"Buena Vista"
"Irene"
"Rinky Dinky"
"Zillion Eyes"
"Jack in the Squares"
"San Diego"
"Jimmy Cricket"

References

2003 albums
Starlight Mints albums